Grobelny (feminine: Grobelna) is a Polish surname. Notable people with the surname include:

 Igor Grobelny (born 1993), Belgian-Polish volleyball player
 Jędrzej Grobelny (born 2001), Polish footballer
 Julian Grobelny (1893–1946), Polish activist
 Kaja Grobelna (born 1995), Belgian-Polish volleyball player
 Ryszard Grobelny (born 1963), Polish politician

See also
 

Polish-language surnames